Hesiod is a crater on Mercury. It has a diameter of 101 kilometers. Its name was adopted by the International Astronomical Union (IAU) in 1976. Hesiod is named for the Ancient Greek poet Hesiod, who lived around 800 BCE.

Kuniyoshi crater is west of Hesiod, and Pampu Facula is centered on its northeastern rim.

References

Impact craters on Mercury